The year 1806 in science and technology involved some significant events, listed below.

Biology
 Publication begins in London of the Flora Graeca collected by John Sibthorp.

Chemistry
 November 20 – Humphry Davy presents the results of his researches in the electrolysis of water to the Royal Society of London.
 Louis Nicolas Vauquelin and Pierre Jean Robiquet isolate asparagine in crystalline form from asparagus juice in France, the first amino acid identified.

Exploration
 August – English seal hunter Abraham Bristow discovers the Auckland Islands.

Mathematics
 Jean-Robert Argand introduces the Argand diagram.
 Adrien-Marie Legendre gives the first published application of the method of least squares, in a supplement to his .

Medicine
 John Bell concludes publication of The Principles of Surgery in two volumes (1801–06). Its treatment of arterial surgery in particular ranks him as a founder of vascular surgery. His brother Charles Bell publishes Essays on The Anatomy of Expression in Painting.

Technology
 October 7 – Carbon paper patented by Ralph Wedgwood in the United Kingdom.

Awards
 Copley Medal: Thomas Andrew Knight

Births
 January 14 – Matthew Fontaine Maury, American oceanographer (died 1873)
 February 14 – Joseph-François Malgaigne, French surgeon (died 1865)
 February 18 – Eduard Heis, German mathematician and astronomer (died 1877)
 April 9 – Isambard Kingdom Brunel, British civil engineer (died 1859)
 June 12 – John A. Roebling, German American bridge engineer (died 1869)
 June 27 – Augustus De Morgan, British logician (died 1871)
 November 21 – Alexander Henry Haliday, Irish entomologist (died 1870)
 December 11 – Otto Wilhelm Hermann von Abich, German geologist (died 1886)
 Luther V. Bell, American psychiatric physician (died 1862)

Deaths
 c. January?? – Mungo Park, Scottish explorer of West Africa (born 1771)
 April 5 – Benjamin Bell, Scottish surgeon (born 1749)
 June 23 – Mathurin Jacques Brisson, French zoologist (born 1723)
 August 3 – Michel Adanson, French botanist (born 1727)
 August 23 – Charles-Augustin de Coulomb, French physicist (born 1736)
 October 9 – Benjamin Banneker, African-American astronomer and surveyor (born 1731)

References

 
19th century in science
1800s in science